Antal Ribáry (often used: Ribári, born: Ridler, 8 January 1924 – 24 April 1992) was a Hungarian composer.

Life 
Ribáry studied at the Franz Liszt Academy of Music between 1943 and 1947, studying composition with Ferenc Szabó, a later rector. In 1959, the Hungarian State Opera presented the one-act comic opera The Divorce of King Louis based on the drama by Sándor Bródy.

Selected works 
Lajos király váilk (The Divorce of King Louis), comic opera in 1 act (1959)
Ligeti tragédia (Ligeti Tragedy), opera in 2 acts
Liliom, opera (1960)
Symphony No. 1 (1960)
Symphony No. 2 (1964)
Symphony No. 3 for brass, timpani and strings (1970)
Symphony No. 4 Elegy (1980)
Cello Concerto No. 1 (1958)
Cello Concerto No. 2 (1977)
Violin Concertino (1965)
Violin Concerto (1987)
Dialoghi (Dialogues) for viola and orchestra (1967)
Sonata for viola and piano (1958)

Discography 
The Music of Antal Ribári (LP, Serenus, New York, 1969, feat.: Erika Sziklay (soprano), Géza Oberfrank (cond.), László Mező (cello), Miklós Erdélyi (cond.), Erzsébet Komlóssy (alto), Ferenc Szőnyi (tenor), Ervin Lukács (cond.), Hungarian Radio Symphonic Orchestra, Tátrai String Quartet, Hungarian Radio Choir)

References 
musicanet.org

1924 births
1992 deaths
Hungarian composers
Hungarian male composers
20th-century Hungarian male musicians